FOB Geronimo  is a former Forward operating base located along the Helmand River Valley in Nawa-I-Barakzayi District, Helmand Province, Afghanistan.  It was originally built for 1st Battalion, 5th Marines by Combat Logistics Battalion 8 (CLB8), of the United States Marine Corps in 2009.

See also

History of the United States Marine Corps
List of United States Marine Corps installations
List of NATO installations in Afghanistan

References

Buildings and structures in Helmand Province
Military installations of the United States in Afghanistan
Geronimo
United States Marine Corps in the War in Afghanistan (2001–2021)